Nirode Ranjan "Putu" Chowdhury  (23 May 1923, Jamshedpur, India - 14 December 1979, Durgapur, India) was an Indian cricketer. 

A medium pace bowler, Putu Chowdhury had an outstanding start to his career. Playing for Bihar in the Ranji Trophy, he took 11, 9 and 10 wickets in his first three matches. In 1944-45, he took a hat-trick against Bengal Governor's XI in Eden Gardens which included the wickets of Vinoo Mankad, Mushtaq Ali and Lala Amarnath. He started his career with Bihar, moved in 1944 to Bengal, where he played most of his cricket, and returned to Bihar in 1955 towards the end of his career.  

He made his Test debut against the West Indies at Madras in 1948/49. He took only one wicket but brilliantly ran out Everton Weekes who had scored hundreds in his five previous innings, and had reached 90 here .  Weekes cut Vinoo Mankad to gully, started to run and was sent back. Chowdhury sent the throw to wicket keeper Probir Sen who ran Weekes out.

In 1951, he spent some time in Alf Gover's cricket school in England. He played a Test against England at home in 1951-52 without success and toured England in 1952 without playing in a Test. His bowling action was sometimes considered suspect, especially while bowling his faster ball.

He was allotted a benefit match which could not be played. He was a coach in the Durgapur steel plant in the later years. His Test bowling average of 205.00 is the second worst for India, after Sunil Gavaskar's 206.00.

References

 Obituary in Indian Cricket 1980

External links
 Cricinfo Profile
 Cricketarchive Profile

1923 births
1979 deaths
Bengal cricketers
Bihar cricketers
India Test cricketers
Indian cricketers
East Zone cricketers
People from Jamshedpur
Cricketers from Jharkhand